Gaths Mine is an asbestos mine in Mashava, Masvingo Province, Zimbabwe, and is located 40 km west of Masvingo city. Gaths Mine as it is now collectively known as is a combination of three mines: King Mine and the now-defunct Temeraire and Gaths. The mine once employed around 1,500 people but as it stands, production has been stopped due to operational challenges. A few employees are left at the mine doing general maintenance. As of November 2011, workers had been without a salary for three years.

The mine was first hit by the international drive against the use of asbestos. This saw the mine investing much money in marketing its type of asbestos white asbestos which is said to be kinder than the blue asbestos. Political interference then saw its major shareholder, Mutumwa Mawere, abandoning the mine and skipping the borders for South Africa where he is currently based. Effects of the Zimbabwean economic situation did not spare the struggling mine which led to mass exodus of its employees followed by the suspension of production.

References
 Gaths Mine Workers Languish in Poverty and Hunger

Population figures have been incorporated into Mashava figures.

Asbestos mines
Buildings and structures in Masvingo Province
Mines in Zimbabwe
Populated places in Zimbabwe